Jack Shepherd or Shepard may refer to:

People
Jack Shepherd (actor) (born 1940), British, in Wycliffe etc.
Jack P. Shepherd (born 1988), British actor, in Coronation Street
Jack Shepard (baseball) (1931–1994), American
Jack Shephard (para-badminton)
Jack Shepherd (writer and podcaster), co-host of The Baby-Sitters Club Club

Fiction
Jack Shephard, character in the TV series Lost
Little Jack Sheppard, 1885 burlesque melodrama
Jack Shepherd, character in the TV series Queenie's Castle
Jack Shepard, character in the film Zoom
Jack Shepard, character in the film Frequency

See also
John Shepherd (disambiguation)
Jack Sheppard (disambiguation)

Shepherd, Jack